Celaenorrhinus beni is a species of butterfly in the family Hesperiidae. It is found in the Republic of the Congo and the Democratic Republic of the Congo.

Subspecies
Celaenorrhinus beni beni (Democratic Republic of the Congo: north-east to Ituri)
Celaenorrhinus beni jacquelinae Miller, 1971 (Congo)

References

Butterflies described in 1908
beni